Bob Derrington was a NASCAR Grand National Series race car driver whose career spanned from 1964 to 1966.

Career
His average start was 20th place while his average finish was 15th. Derrington also earned three finishes in the "top five" and raced a distance of  - the equivalent of 13,427 laps.

However, he only managed to lead a single lap in his entire career and earned a meager $26,530 ($ when adjusted for inflation). Derrington had an 80-race winless streak during his NASCAR career. Finishing an average of 15th place, he managed to qualify in 20th place during an average qualifying session; making his finishes better on average than his starts.

During his career, Derrington was caught by NASCAR officials for having a 23-gallon tank in his vehicle instead of the mandated 22-gallon tank. His vehicle had to go to a nearby welding shop to make the fuel tank conform to the NASCAR standards at that time.

References

1930 births
2011 deaths
NASCAR drivers
Racing drivers from Houston